Emamzadeh Soltan Mir Ahmad is an Emamzadeh in Kashan, Iran. The tiling in front of the larger iwan and the two minarets of the building were repaired and rebuilt in the Qajar era. The emamzadeh includes a large courtyard, an iwan and a shrine. It has a conical dome and big porticoes.

See also 
List of the historical structures in the Isfahan province

References 

Architecture in Iran
Buildings and structures in Kashan